This glossary of history is a list of definitions of terms and concepts relevant to the study of history and its related fields and sub-disciplines, including both prehistory and the period of human history.

A

B

C

D

E

F

G

H

I

J

L

M

N

O

P

Q

R

S

T

U

W

Y

See also
Index of history articles
Outline of history

References

General information

USMP Glossary: Paleontology
DCMI Metadata Terms

 
Wikipedia glossaries using description lists